Hitman: The Untold Story of Johnny Martorano is a book about Johnny Martorano, a former hitman for the Winter Hill Gang in Boston, Massachusetts who murdered 20 people for the gang.

2011 non-fiction books
Non-fiction books about contract killers
Non-fiction books about gangsters
Forge Books books